Amasya Protocol (Amasya Görüşmeleri) was a memorandum of understanding signed on 22 October 1919 in Amasya, Turkey between the Ottoman imperial government in Istanbul and the Turkish revolutionaries (the Turkish National Movement) aimed at seeking ways to preserve national independence and unity through joint efforts. It also signified a recognition by the Ottoman government of the rising Turkish revolutionary forces in Anatolia.

Mustafa Kemal Atatürk, Rauf Orbay and Bekir Sami Kunduh on the one side, in their title of Delegation of Representatives (Heyeti Temsiliye) as attributed by the Sivas Congress, and the Ottoman Minister of Marine (later grand vizier himself) Hulusi Salih Pasha, who had come to Amasya to represent the short-lived Ottoman government of Ali Rıza Pasha on the other side, all signed the protocol just after the Sivas Congress in the same city of the Amasya Circular.

The protocol agreed that new elections would be held that year for the Chamber of Deputies (the popularly elected lower house of the Ottoman parliament), and the Chamber would convene outside Istanbul (at the time occupied by the Allies), consider passing the resolutions of the Sivas Congress and describes the new country as "The lands which Kurds and Turks inhabit"  Although it did not convene outside Istanbul as promised, the new Chamber convened on 12 January 1920 and passed the Misak-ı Millî (National Pact) agreed to at the Sivas and Erzurum Congresses, after which the Allies, in an effort to stamp out the nascent Turkish National Movement, forced it to dissolve and declared martial law in Istanbul.

See also
 Amasya Circular
 Misak-ı Millî
 Sivas Congress
 Erzurum Congress
 Ankara Government

References

Turkish War of Independence
History of Amasya
Sivas vilayet
1919 in the Ottoman Empire